Chiaroscuro, in comics, may refer to:
 Chiaroscuro (2000 AD), a 2000 AD horror comic series.
 Chiaroscuro: The Private Lives of Leonardo da Vinci, a 1995-1996/2005 Vertigo comic book.
 Chiaroscuro (IDW Publishing), a 2000-2005/2007 series by Canadian artist Troy Little.

See also
 Chiaroscuro (disambiguation)